Zatonsky is a surname. Notable people with the surname include:

 Dmitry Zatonsky (born 1971), Russian ice hockey player
 Volodymyr Zatonsky (1888–1938), Soviet academic, politician, and activist

Russian-language surnames